Ouardana (Tarifit: Iwardenen, ⵉⵡⴰⵔⴷⴻⵏⴻⵏ; Arabic: وردانة) is a commune in Bentayeb of the Oriental administrative region of Morocco. At the time of the 2004 census, the commune had a total population of 6921 people living in 1242 households.

References

Populated places in Driouch Province
Rural communes of Oriental (Morocco)